Sadao (written: , ,  or  in katakana) is a masculine Japanese given name. Notable people with the name include:

, Japanese actor and musician
, Imperial Japanese Army general, politician, and political philosopher
, Japanese classical composer
, Japanese politician
, Japanese gay erotic artist
, Japanese sport wrestler
, Japanese sumo wrestler
, United States Army soldier and Medal of Honor recipient
, Japanese film director and screenwriter
, Japanese sport wrestler
, Japanese astronomer
, Japanese entomologist
, Japanese sumo wrestler
, Japanese printmaker
, Japanese jazz musician
, Japanese politician
, Japanese film director and screenwriter

Japanese masculine given names